The Code Is Red...Long Live the Code is Napalm Death's eleventh studio album and was recorded at Foel Studio, Llanfair Caerinion with producer Russ Russell. It was released on 25 April 2005. A music video for "Silence Is Deafening", directed by Roger Johansson, was released later that year.

Some editions of the album were released with a bonus disc that contains material from a variety of death metal bands, such as Aborted. The Napalm Death song "Silence Is Deafening" is the first track on the compilation.

The album features guest appearances by Jello Biafra of Dead Kennedys, Jamey Jasta of Hatebreed, and Jeffrey Walker of Carcass.

In 2017, Decibel released a special magazine issue relating to the 30th Anniversary of Napalm Death. This issue included a Decibel Magazine Hall of Fame induction for The Code Is Red... Long Live the Code.

Track listing

Personnel

Napalm Death
 Mark "Barney" Greenway – lead vocals
 Mitch Harris – lead guitar, backing vocals
 Shane Embury – bass, backing vocals, rhythm guitar (14)
 Danny Herrera – drums

Additional musicians
 Jello Biafra – vocals (7)
 Jamey Jasta – vocals (6, 8)
 Jeffrey Walker – vocals (12)

Technical personnel
 Russ Russell – production, recording, mixing, mastering
 Dave Anderson – assistant production, assistant recording, assistant mixing
 Winter – recording (7), engineering (7)
 Billy Gould – assistant recording (7), assistant engineering (7)
 Mitch Harris – video direction, video editing

References

Napalm Death albums
Century Media Records albums
2005 albums